The 2021 Galway Senior Hurling Championship was the 124th staging of the Galway Senior Hurling Championship since its establishment in 1887.  It was won by St. Thomas' for the fourth consecutive year and the sixth time in total.

Kilconieron participated in the senior championship having beaten Moycullen in the delayed 2020 Galway Intermediate Hurling Championship.
The competition was sponsored by Brooks for the second of a 3-year partnership that started in 2020.

Competition format
Twenty four teams compete in the initial group stages of the championship – the top ranked twelve teams compete in the Senior A Group and the second ranked twelve teams compete in the Senior B Group. Eight teams from the Senior A Group and four teams from the Senior B Group progress to the knockout stage. The competition format is explained further in each of the championship rounds in the sections below.

Group stage

Senior A
Senior A consists of 12 teams divided into three groups of 4 teams. The top teams from each group plus one drawn second team qualify for the quarter finals. The remaining 2 second placed teams play in the preliminary quarter finals. The bottom team from each group will be relegated to playing in the following year's Senior B Section.

Senior A – Group 1
{| class="wikitable" 
!width=20|
!  style="width:150px; text-align:left;"|Team
!width=20|
!width=20|
!width=20|
!width=20|
!width=50|
!width=50|
!width=20|
!width=20|
|- style="background:#98FB98;"
|1||align=left| Craughwell                  ||3||2||1||0||3–60||2–50||13||5
|- style="background:#ccf;"
|2||align=left| Turloughmore     ||3||2||1||0||4–57||2–52||11||5
|-
|3||align=left| Castlegar                    ||3||1||0||2||5–56||3–55||7||2
|- style="background:#FFBBBB;"
|4||align=left| Ahascragh-Fohenagh  ||3||0||0||3||0–44||5–60||-31||0
|}

Senior A – Group 2
{| class="wikitable" 
!width=20|
!  style="width:150px; text-align:left;"|Team
!width=20|
!width=20|
!width=20|
!width=20|
!width=40|
!width=35|
!width=20|
!width=20|
|- style="background:#98FB98;"
|1|| style="text-align:left;"| St. Thomas'    ||3||3||0||0||4–62||4–41||21||6
|- style="background:#98FB98;"
|2|| style="text-align:left;"| Cappataggle    ||3||1||1||1||3–47||1–52||1||3
|- 
|3|| style="text-align:left;"| Killimordaly  ||3||0||2||1||1–45||4–56||-8||2
|- style="background:#FFBBBB;"
|4|| style="text-align:left;"| Liam Mellows  ||3||0||1||2||0–49||3–54||-14||1
|}
 Cappataggle were drawn from the second placed teams to go straight into the quarter finals

Senior A – Group 3
{| class="wikitable" 
!width=20|
!  style="width:150px; text-align:left;"|Team
!width=20|
!width=20|
!width=20|
!width=20|
!width=40|
!width=35|
!width=20|
!width=20|
|- style="background:#98FB98;"
|1|| style="text-align:left;"| Tommy Larkin's          ||3||2||0||1||6–49||0–54||13||4
|- style="background:#ccf;"
|2|| style="text-align:left;"| Loughrea                      ||3||2||0||1||1–62||3–44||12||4
|-
|3|| style="text-align:left;"| Sarsfields  ||3||2||0||1||2–63||2–54||9||4
|- style="background:#FFBBBB;"
|4|| style="text-align:left;"| Oranmore-Maree          ||3||0||0||3||1–40||5–62||-34||0
|}

Senior B
Senior B consists of 12 teams divided into two groups of 6. The winners of each group qualify for the preliminary quarter finals and compete in the following year's Senior A competition. The four second and third placed teams play-off with the two winners also qualifying for the preliminary quarter finals.

Senior B – Group 1

{| class="wikitable" 
!width=20|
!  style="width:150px; text-align:left;"|Team
!width=20|
!width=20|
!width=20|
!width=20|
!width=40|
!width=45|
!width=20|
!width=20|
|- style="background:#ccf;"
|1|| style="text-align:left;"| Gort                                ||3||3||0||0||1–71||6–35||19||6
|- style="background:#ccf;"
|2|| style="text-align:left;"| Padraig Pearses         ||3||1||1||1||7–36||1–48||6||3
|-
|3|| style="text-align:left;"| Athenry                          ||3||0||2||1||5–50||4–54||-1||2
|- style="background:#FFBBBB;"
|4|| style="text-align:left;"| Tynagh-Abbey/Duniry  ||3||0||1||2||4–41||6–61||-26||1
|}

Senior B – Group 2

{| class="wikitable" 
!width=20|
!  style="width:150px; text-align:left;"|Team
!width=20|
!width=20|
!width=20|
!width=20|
!width=30|
!width=40|
!width=20|
!width=20|
|- style="background:#ccf;"
|1||align=left| Clarinbridge              ||3||3||0||0||1–75||2–39||33||4
|- style="background:#ccf;"
|2||align=left| Kilnadeema-Leitrim  ||3||2||0||1||3–56||3–61||-5||4
|-
|3||align=left| Ardrahan                      ||3||1||0||2||4–44||2–57||-7||2
|- style="background:#FFBBBB;"
|4||align=left| Mullagh                        ||3||0||0||3||3–41||4–59||-21||0
|}

Senior B – Group 3

{| class="wikitable" 
!width=20|
!  style="width:150px; text-align:left;"|Team
!width=20|
!width=20|
!width=20|
!width=20|
!width=30|
!width=40|
!width=20|
!width=20|
|- style="background:#ccf;"
|1||align=left| Kilconieron      ||3||2||1||0||2–62||5–45||8||5
|- style="background:#ccf;"
|2||align=left| Portumna            ||3||1||1||1||3–54||5–51||-3||3
|-
|3||align=left| Beagh                  ||3||1||0||2||2–55||2–57||-1||2
|- style="background:#FFBBBB;"
|4||align=left| Ballinderreen  ||3||1||0||2||9–43||4–61||0||2
|}

Senior Relegation
{| class="wikitable" 
!width=20|
!  style="width:150px; text-align:left;"|Team
!width=20|
!width=20|
!width=20|
!width=20|
!width=50|
!width=50|
!width=20|
!width=20|
|- style="background:#98FB98;"
|1||align=left| Mullagh                          ||2||2||0||0||3–29||2–23||9||4
|- style="background:#FFBBBB;"
|2||align=left| Ballinderreen              ||2||1||0||1||3–16||2–19||2||2
|- style="background:#FFBBBB;"
|3||align=left| Tynagh-Abbey/Duniry  ||2||0||0||2||2–19||4–24||-11||0
|}

Senior Relegation Playoff

Senior Knockout stage

Senior Preliminary Quarter-finals

Senior Quarter-finals

The three teams who finished first in the Senior A groups and one of the second placed teams (drawn at random) will play the four winners of the senior preliminary quarter finals.

Senior Semi-finals

Senior final

References

Galway Senior Hurling Championship
Galway Senior Hurling Championship
Galway Senior Hurling Championship